Koke or KOKE may refer to:

People
Koke (footballer, born 1983), full name Sergio Contreras Pardo, Spanish football forward
Koke (footballer, born 1992), full name Jorge Resurrección Merodio, Spanish football midfielder for Atlético Madrid and Spain
Koke (footballer, born 2000), full name Jorge Saiz Colomer, Spanish football winger
Koke Vegas (Jorge Ruiz Ojeda, born 1995), Spanish football goalkeeper who plays for RC Deportivo
Semir Cerić Koke (born 1963), Bosnian folk singer

Other uses
Kōke (or Koke), noble ranking below a daimyō in Japan during the Edo period
Koke, Estonia, village in Haaslava Parish, Tartu County, Estonia
Koke language of Chad
KOKE (AM), a radio station (1600 AM) licensed to serve Pflugerville, Texas, United States
KOKE-FM, a radio station (99.3 FM) licensed to serve Thorndale, Texas
KOKE, the 1958-1991 callsign of KJCE, Rollingwood, Texas

See also
Kōkeʻe State Park, Hawaii, USA
 Kokey (disambiguation)